Sally in Our Alley is a 1931 British romantic comedy drama film directed by Maurice Elvey and starring Gracie Fields, Ian Hunter, and Florence Desmond. It is based on the 1923 West End play The Likes of Her by Charles McEvoy.

Plot summary
A British soldier (Ian Hunter) goes off to fight in the First World War, with his girlfriend (Gracie Fields) waiting and worried at home. He is soon wounded in battle and crippled. He comes to the conclusion that she would be better off believing that he has been killed so she can get on with her life. She gets the news and is devastated. Several years later she is still grieving for him, but he has now been cured and goes looking for her.

Cast
Gracie Fields as Sally Winch
Ian Hunter as George Miles
Florence Desmond as Florrie Small
Ivor Barnard as Tod Small
Fred Groves as Alf Cope
Gibb McLaughlin as Jim Sears
Ben Field as Sam Bilson
Barbara Gott as Mrs Pool
Renée Macready as Lady Daphne
Helen Ferrers as Duchess of Wexford

Production
Shooting for the film started on 23 March 1931 at Beaconsfield Studios by Associated Talking Pictures, who relocated to Ealing Studios the following year. Shooting lasted six weeks, concluding in early May. It marked the screen debut of Gracie Fields who was an established music hall star. Fields' husband, the screenwriter Archie Pitt was originally set to play the role of Alf Cope. However, after less than a week of filming, as Fields and Pitt were travelling back from shooting, their car crashed. Though Fields escaped injury, Pitt was forced to withdraw from the cast in order to recuperate. Due to his experience and availability, the role was quickly recast with Fred Groves. The film incorporated Fields' hugely popular signature song, Sally, itself a reference to Henry Carey's 1725 song, Sally in Our Alley, which had long been a traditional English country dance. It included the first use of the Dunning Process in Britain.

The film took £100,000 at the box office, establishing Fields as a national film star.

The film's sets were designed by the art director Norman G. Arnold.

Home media
This film was released in the UK as part of the Gracie Fields collector's edition DVD box set in 2008, which in addition to this film includes Looking on the Bright Side (1932), Love, Life and Laughter (1934), Sing As We Go (1934), Look Up and Laugh (1935), Queen of Hearts (1936) and The Show Goes On (1937). A Blu-ray standalone version followed in 2020, restored from a 35mm fine grain master print.

References

Bibliography
 Low, Rachael. Filmmaking in 1930s Britain. George Allen & Unwin, 1985.
 Perry, George. Forever Ealing. Pavilion Books, 1994.
 Sweet, Matthew. Shepperton Babylon: The Lost Worlds of British Cinema. Faber and Faber, 2005.
 Wood, Linda. British Films, 1927-1939. British Film Institute, 1986.

External links
 
 

1931 films
1930s romantic comedy-drama films
1930s English-language films
Films shot at Beaconsfield Studios
British romantic comedy-drama films
Films directed by Maurice Elvey
British films based on plays
Associated Talking Pictures
Films set in England
Films set in London
Films set in the 1910s
1931 comedy films
1931 drama films
1930s British films